The 2011 F-League was the first season of the F-League, the top Australian professional league for futsal clubs.

Teams
Six teams competed in the league.

 Boomerangs
 Dural Warriors
 Inner City
 Maccabi Hakoah
 Parramatta Blues
 St Albans Strikers

League table

Results

Regular season

Semi-finals

Grand Final

References

External links
 SportsTG

2011 F-League
F-League seasons